Barry Peter Armitage (born 11 May 1979) is a South African baseball pitcher. Armitage was the first South African-born baseball player ever to make an appearance in any Major League Baseball game when he threw an inning for Kansas City Royals against the Houston Astros in a 2005 exhibition game.

Career
Armitage signed with the Royals following a try-out in front of then assistant general manager Allard Baird in 2000. He made his professional debut later that year with the Gulf Coast Royals of the Gulf Coast League in the United States. Armitage left the Royals farm system following two seasons with the Wichita Wranglers of the AA Texas League. Armitage played in 2007 in the Atlantic League with the Newark Bears and Lancaster Barnstormers. Armitage did not play professionally in 2008.

International career
Armitage has played with the South Africa national baseball team in various tournaments throughout his career. He played in the World Baseball Classic in 2006 and 2009.

Personal
Barry Armitage married Jen Dishner on 18 March 2017 in Scottsdale, Arizona. They reside in Cave Creek, Arizona with their two dogs, Simba and Khaya.

References

External links

1979 births
Living people
Baseball pitchers
Burlington Bees players
Gulf Coast Royals players
Lancaster Barnstormers players
Newark Bears players
South African expatriate baseball players in the United States
Spokane Indians players
Sportspeople from Durban
White South African people
Wichita Wranglers players
Wilmington Blue Rocks players
2006 World Baseball Classic players
2009 World Baseball Classic players